Armas Leinonen (28 December 1900 – 29 May 1985) was a Finnish schoolteacher and politician, born in Oulu. He was a member of the Parliament of Finland, representing the People's Party of Finland from 1952 to 1965 and the Liberal People's Party from 1965 to 1970.

References

1900 births
1985 deaths
People from Oulu
People from Oulu Province (Grand Duchy of Finland)
Finnish Lutherans
People's Party of Finland (1951) politicians
Liberals (Finland) politicians
Members of the Parliament of Finland (1951–54)
Members of the Parliament of Finland (1954–58)
Members of the Parliament of Finland (1958–62)
Members of the Parliament of Finland (1962–66)
Members of the Parliament of Finland (1966–70)
Finnish schoolteachers
20th-century Lutherans